The Speaker of the Tamil Nadu Legislative Assembly is the presiding officer of the Legislative Assembly of Tamil Nadu, the main law-making body for the Indian state of Tamil Nadu. He is elected by the members of the Tamil Nadu Legislative Assembly (until 1968, the Madras Legislative Assembly). The speaker is always a member of the Legislative Assembly.

List of presidents of the Madras Legislative Council 

Madras Legislative Council, the first representative legislature for the Madras Presidency (political predecessor for Tamil Nadu) was inaugurated in December 1920 as per the Montagu-Chelmsford reforms. The presiding officer of the Council was known as the President. The first President, Sir P. Rajagopalachari was not elected but nominated and took office on 17 December 1920.

List of chairmen of Madras Legislative Council
With the introduction of provincial autonomy in 1937, the Council became the upper chamber of a bicameral legislature. The presiding officer of the Council was called as the "Chairman of the Council". This agreement continued in the Republic of India as well till the Council's abolition in 1986.

List of speakers of the Legislative Assembly of Madras Presidency 
The Government of India Act of 1935 abolished dyarchy and ensured provincial autonomy. It created a  bicameral legislature in the Madras Presidency. The legislature consisted of the governor and two legislative bodies – a legislative assembly and a legislative council. The presiding officer of the assembly was called the "Speaker".

List of speakers

Madras State

Madras State, precursor to the present day state of Tamil Nadu, was created after Indian independence on 26 January 1950. It comprised present-day Tamil Nadu and parts of present-day Andhra Pradesh, Karnataka and Kerala. The first legislature of the Madras State to be elected on the basis of universal suffrage was constituted on 1 March 1952, after the general elections held in January 1952.

Tamil Nadu 

Madras was renamed Tamil Nadu in January 1969.

Notes 

Speakers, lower houses
 
Speakers
Lists of legislative speakers in India
Speakers